Thurgoland is a civil parish in the metropolitan borough of Barnsley, South Yorkshire, England.  The parish contains 17 listed buildings that are recorded in the National Heritage List for England.  Of these, one is listed at Grade II*, the middle of the three grades, and the others are at Grade II, the lowest grade.  The parish contains the village of Thurgoland and the surrounding countryside.  Most of the listed buildings are houses and cottages, farmhouses and farm buildings.  The other listed buildings are a former wire works, two bridges, a church, and a milepost.


Key

Buildings

References

Citations

Sources

 

Lists of listed buildings in South Yorkshire
Buildings and structures in the Metropolitan Borough of Barnsley